Thala may refer to:

Places 
 Thala Hills, Antarctica
 Thala Island, Antarctica
 Thala Rock, Antarctica
 Thala, Tunisia, a town in Kasserine Governorate

Other uses 

 Thala (gastropod), a genus of sea snails
 Ajith Kumar (born 1971), Indian actor known as Thala
 Battle of Thala, second century BC battle between Rome and Jugurtha of Numidia
 MS Dhoni (born 1981), Indian cricketer known as Thala

See also 
 Tala (disambiguation)